Kouvot is a Finnish professional basketball team based in Kouvola. Founded in 1964, the team plays in the Korisliiga and has won the national championship four times: in 1995, 1999, 2004, and 2016. The team plays at the Mansikka-ahon urheiluhalli.

Trophies
Korisliiga
Champions (4): 1994–95, 1998–99, 2003–04, 2015–16
Runner-up (4): 1996–97, 1997–98, 2007–08, 2018–19
Bronze (1): 2009–10 
Finnish Cup
Winners (1): 1997–98
Runner-up (4): 1996-97, 2000-01, 2002-03, 2006-07
First Division
Winners(1): 1992–93

Logos

Players

Current roster

Notable players

 Jason Conley  
 Antti Kanervo
 Alexander Madsen 
 Devon van Oostrum  
 D.J. Richardson
 Jukka Toijala
 Eli Scott

References

External links
Eurobasket.com Kouvot Page

Basketball teams in Finland
Kouvola
1964 establishments in Finland